Mehringhof is a socialized building complex in Kreuzberg, Berlin, designed as a center for alternative activities. As of 1991, it hosted 38 projects, including a theater, an electronics collective (Wuseltronick), a printing collective, and a school for adults.

Administration 

In 1978, anonymous benefactors donated  2 million to purchase the Mehringhof factory complex in Kreuzberg to build a center for alternative activities. Mehringhof incorporated as a limited liability GmbH without named owners and was governed by an assembly of tenants who paid maintenance rent. This group decided on new tenants, changes in rent, and handling maintenance.

References

Bibliography

Further reading

External links 

 

1978 establishments in Germany
Autonomism
Buildings and structures in Berlin
Social centres